Colonel Karl Robin Bendetsen (October 11, 1907 – June 28, 1989) was an American politician and military officer who served in the Washington Army National Guard during World War II and later as the United States Under Secretary of the Army. Bendetsen is remembered primarily for his role as an architect of the internment of Japanese Americans during World War II, a role he tried to downplay in later years.

Early life
Karl Bendetsen was born into a Lithuanian Jewish family in Aberdeen, Washington. His parents, Albert M. and Anna Bendetson, were first-generation American citizens. Karl changed the spelling of his last name during early 1942, and would later make written claims to descent from Danish lumbermen who had come to America as early as 1670.

Military career

Prior to World War II
Bendetson (as he was then known) enlisted in the Washington Army National Guard, at the age of fourteen. While this was well below legal age, the National Guard turned a blind eye to the many young men who desired to enlist while who were still in—or, as in Bendetsen's case, had yet to enter—high school.

As he matured, Karl entered Army ROTC, eventually taking an infantry commission in the Army Reserve.

1941
Bendetson, now a major, was on the administrative staff of Judge Advocate General Major General Allen W. Guillion, in the Wartime Civil Control Administration.

In early September 1941, Bendetson was sent to Hawaii to discuss the need to intern enemy aliens in case of war.  He stated in his notes that there were 134,000 American citizens of Japanese descent in the islands, and worried that "good Americans" might "give Japs the benefit of the doubt" for economic reasons. 

In November, Bendetson was sent to take over an aircraft plant in New Jersey, as part of a plan by President Franklin D. Roosevelt to boost production of factories making materiel needed by Great Britain. 

Major Bendetson was given this assignment after having written the orders for seizure and strike-breaking at a North American Aviation plant, but the army had taken charge of the Air Associates plant in October, prior to his arrival.  In later years, however, Bendetsen would describe a wild scene of standing on his overturned car to face down the "mass" of strikers who had blocked his way into the plant.

The strike settled, Bendetson was back at his own desk in early December.

Architect of the internment of Japanese Americans
Immediately following the Japanese attack on Pearl Harbor on December 7, 1941, the Federal Bureau of Investigation arrested approximately 5,500 leaders in the Japanese American communities in Alaska, Washington, Oregon, California, and Hawaii.  While the government was worried that these leaders had been involved in anti-American activity on behalf of the Empire of Japan, eventually, all were cleared of any wrongdoing.

However, President Roosevelt signed Executive Order 9066 in early 1942, which authorized military commanders to designate "exclusion zones", "from which any or all persons may be excluded" for reasons of military security. Following that authorization, Bendetsen (he had changed his name by this time) developed a plan by which all persons of Japanese ancestry, whether foreign-born or American-born, were forcibly interned in concentration camps. He then pressured Lieutenant General John L. DeWitt to accept his plan, rather than the less-restrictive one which DeWitt had originally intended.

Initially, only southern Arizona and the western parts of Washington, Oregon and California were designated as "Military Area No. 1," and many Japanese Americans simply moved to the eastern portions of their home states, while several thousand moved to other states.  Bendetsen would later call this "voluntary relocation," though the moves were done at the orders of the government. The Western Defense Command then announced that the exclusion zone would be expanded to include all of California and created "Military Area No. 2," at the same time prohibiting Japanese Americans from leaving either military area. Only those who had moved outside California escaped being rounded up and confined in makeshift "assembly centers" (often horse stalls at racetracks and fairgrounds), and then later incarceration in "relocation centers."

While Bendetsen and other supporters of internment cited military necessity (and continue to do so), reports by the FBI and by the Office of Naval Intelligence had stated that not only were vast majority of Americans of Japanese ancestry loyal, but likewise their parents (who had been denied American citizenship) were loyal to the United States and held no allegiance to Japan.

Bendetsen also ordered that any person, no matter their age, who had "one drop of Japanese blood" were to be confined.  This included the removal of infants and children from orphanages and the transportation of hospital patients, a number of whom died when their care was cut off.  He would later claim that the orders were not so broad-sweeping, though even Military Intelligence Service officers of Japanese ancestry were forced to leave California.

Throughout the rest of the war, Bendetsen and DeWitt opposed army orders that soldiers of Japanese ancestry be allowed to re-enter the coastal states while on leave or military assignment.  The reason for opposition was primarily political along with the fear of ridicule because the soldiers had proven patriotic Americans while the government had spent millions of dollars to put those soldiers' families behind barbed wire.

Opposition to Japanese American redress
Bendetsen joined others who had been involved in the exclusion and incarceration to oppose the Commission on Wartime Relocation and Internment of Civilians hearings, which in 1983 determined that there had been no just cause for the actions taken against Japanese American communities during World War II.  He was adamantly opposed to calls for reparations to be paid to former camp inmates and their relatives.

Embellishments and falsehoods
After the war, Bendetsen's claims of his importance to the army and role in the war grew, while admissions of his role in the internment shrank.

Pearl Harbor
One of the greatest of these claims was given when interviewed in 1972 for the Harry S. Truman library. Speaking to historian Jerry Hess, Bendetsen claimed to have spent "late 1941" carrying "the title of Special Representative of the Secretary of War" to have conferences with Major General Douglas MacArthur in the Philippines. He also claimed to have stopped to meet with Lieutenant General Walter C. Short (the military commander in charge of Hawaiian defenses) and Rear Admiral Husband E. Kimmel (commander of the Pacific Fleet), leaving only days before the Pearl Harbor attacks. 

In this oral history, Bendetsen tells in great detail that the United Airlines plane returning him from Hawaii had landed in Washington at 9 a.m. on December 7, with Bendetsen carrying "a personal and important message" from General Short to Army Chief of Staff George C. Marshall. Bendetsen claims he had been told that Marshall was out riding his horse, "so why don't you go home, kiss your wife ... be here by 10 a.m." Then, Bendetsen continues, upon reaching the house an urgent phone call summoned him back to the office and he was told of the Pearl Harbor attacks "twenty minutes later."

Family histories
Bendetsen's grandparents had emigrated from Lithuania and Poland in the 1860s.  His father was born in New York, and was co-owner of a clothing store.
However:
 In early 1942, Karl changed the spelling of his name from "Bendetson" to "Bendetsen."
 In 1970, Bendetsen claimed (for the National Cyclopedia of American Biography) that he was "grandson of Benedict and Dora Robbins Bendetsen, and great-grandson of Benedict Benediktssen, who came to this country from Denmark about 1815 ..." In truth, Bendetsen's paternal grandparents were Samuel A. and Catherine Rabbin Bendetson, who were born in Germany (1830) and Poland (1838), respectively.
 In 1983, he took time from testifying in opposition to redress for Japanese American internment camp survivors to describe how his first Danish ancestor "came over here in 1670, decided he didn't want to be a sailor, he wanted to be a farmer ... my family has been in timber ever since." He also described selling lumber to Japanese ships. In truth, Bendetsen's family first entered the "timber" business after he retired from the army, when he became a general consultant for the Champion Paper & Fibre Company in 1952. Rising to company president (the reason for the Biography entry in 1970), Karl was described as "ruthless" by his lifelong friends, who also were critical of his betrayal of his Jewish heritage.

See also

John L. DeWitt

References

Further reading

Books
  

Interviews
  

External links
  Selected documents from the Bendetsen Papers online at the Hoover Institution Archives, Stanford University.
 
 
 
 
 
 
 
 
 
 
 
 
 
 
 
 
 
 
 
 
 
 
 
 
 
 

1907 births
1989 deaths
Internment of Japanese Americans
United States Army personnel of World War II
American people of Lithuanian-Jewish descent
United States Army officers
Attack on Pearl Harbor
General Counsels of the United States Army
20th-century American lawyers
United States Under Secretaries of the Army
National Guard (United States) officers